Yani Van den Bossche (born 1 June 2001) is a Belgian professional footballer who plays as a winger for Knokke.

Club career
Van den Bossche made his professional debut for Kortrijk in a 2-1 Belgian First Division A win over K.V. Mechelen on 17 October 2020.

On 17 August 2021, he signed a two-year contract with Knokke in the third-tier Belgian National Division 1.

References

External links
 

2001 births
Living people
People from Lier, Belgium
Belgian footballers
Association football wingers
K.V. Kortrijk players
Belgian Pro League players
Footballers from Antwerp Province